Elm Grove Township may refer to:

Elm Grove Township, Tazewell County, Illinois
Elm Grove Township, Calhoun County, Iowa
Elm Grove Township, Louisa County, Iowa